Waldemar Birger Holberg was a Danish boxer.  Born in Copenhagen, Denmark on May 29, 1883, he won the World Welterweight Championship on January 1, 1914, defeating Ray Bronson in Melbourne, Australia in a twenty round points decision.  He was a fierce boxer with a KO percentage of 40% in the virtually complete boxing record displayed on BoxRec.

Boxing career
Prior to his entry into the Olympics, Holberg was a five time amateur champion of Denmark. He won the featherweight division in 1902, and the lightweight division in 1903, 1905, 1907, and 1908.  He qualified for the 1908 Summer Olympics, but was eliminated in the first round after losing to future welterweight world champion Matt Wells.

After the Olympics, Holberg turned professional making his debut in Denmark. He had a number of wins in Denmark and Germany but moved to England in 1912. After losing two bouts on disqualification, Holberg moved to Australia in 1913 fighting for the Australian lightweight title.

Taking the Australian version of the world welterweight title

He had limited success in Australia, losing 6 out of 9 matches but on New Years Day, 1914 met American Ray Bronson in Melbourne in a bout recognized by the Australian boxing authorities as a World Welterweight title. Holberg won easily on points after 20 rounds.  He held the title for only twenty-three days, losing it in Melbourne to Irishman Tom McCormick in a sixth round foul on January 24. By several accounts, Holberg sometimes fought with questionable tactics, and had lost five previous fights to fouls.  For some reason, McCormick is more often recognized as a world welterweight boxing champion than Holberg.

After having lost the world title, he returned to Denmark only to lose two matches in Copenhagen to Danish veteran Dick Nelson on December 2, 1914, and February 14, 1915, one for the Scandinavian Welterweight title. Holberg had his last professional fight on August 29, 1921 when he was stopped in Vienna by Austrian Hans Hirschberger.

Holberg retired from professional boxing in 1921 after his loss to Hirschberger.  He died in Vienna on March 18, 1927, at age 43.

Professional boxing record

See also
Lineal championship
List of welterweight boxing champions

References

|-

External links

profile

1883 births
1927 deaths
Lightweight boxers
Olympic boxers of Denmark
Jewish boxers
Jewish Danish sportspeople
World boxing champions
World welterweight boxing champions
Welterweight boxers
Boxers at the 1908 Summer Olympics
Danish male boxers
Sportspeople from Copenhagen